Mabbott is a surname. Notable people with the surname include:

Barrie Mabbott (born 1960), New Zealand rower
Joe Mabbott, American record producer and audio engineer
Michael Mabbott, Canadian film and television director and writer
Thomas Ollive Mabbott (1898–1968), American academic

See also
Mabbutt